Joseph Benjamin Strong (born September 9, 1962) is an American former professional baseball pitcher.

Career 
Strong attended the University of California, Riverside, where he played college baseball for the Highlanders during the 1984 season. He was drafted by the Oakland Athletics in the 15th round of the 1984 MLB draft. In February , he signed with the Tampa Bay Devil Rays, became a free agent at the end of the season, and signed with the Florida Marlins in February . After having played in five countries over 16 years, Strong made his MLB debut for the Marlins on May 11, 2000, becoming the oldest MLB rookie in 40 years.

On June 17, 2000, Strong picked up his only MLB save. He retired the final out of the 11th inning to preserve a 4-3 Marlins victory over the Pirates. He played for the Marlins again in 2001 and became a free agent after the season ended. In , he played for the Milwaukee Brewers' Triple-A affiliate, the Indianapolis Indians. In , his final season, he played for the independent Camden Riversharks of the Atlantic League.

References

External links

Career statistics and player information from Korea Baseball Organization

1962 births
Living people
Acereros de Monclova players
African-American baseball players
American expatriate baseball players in Canada
American expatriate baseball players in Mexico
American expatriate baseball players in South Korea
American expatriate baseball players in Taiwan
Baseball players from California
Bridgeport Bluefish players
Broncos de Reynosa players
Calgary Cannons players
Camden Riversharks players
China Times Eagles players
Durham Bulls players
Florida Marlins players
Huntsville Stars players
Hyundai Unicorns players
Indianapolis Indians players
KBO League pitchers
Las Vegas Stars (baseball) players
Leones de Yucatán players
Major League Baseball pitchers
Major League Baseball replacement players
Medford A's players
Mexican League baseball pitchers
Orlando Rays players
People from Fairfield, California
Rancho Cucamonga Quakes players
Reno Silver Sox players
San Bernardino Spirit players
Surrey Glaciers players
UC Riverside Highlanders baseball players
Wei Chuan Dragons players
Wichita Wranglers players
21st-century African-American people
20th-century African-American sportspeople